Skempton is a surname. Notable people with the surname include:

 Alec Skempton (1914–2001), British civil engineer, pioneer of soil mechanics
 Howard Skempton (born 1947), English composer, pianist, and accordionist